Burgruine Neu-Montfort is a castle in Vorarlberg, Austria.

See also
List of castles in Austria

References

This article was initially translated from the German Wikipedia.

Buildings and structures completed in 1319
Castles in Vorarlberg
Bregenz Forest Mountains